Melanie R. Bond is a biologist, primate scientist and author. She was the first woman to serve as a gorilla keeper at the National Zoo in Washington, D.C. She authored and co-authored several books on primates and animal keeping, including the Orangutan (Pongo) Care Manual for the Association of Zoos & Aquariums.

Selected publications 
 Bond, M. R. (1979). Second-generation captive birth of an orang-utan Pongo pygmaeus. International Zoo Yearbook.
 BOND, M. R., & BLOCK, J. A. (1982). Growth and development of twin Orang‐utans. International Zoo Yearbook, 22(1), 256-261.

References 

Year of birth missing (living people)
Living people
Women primatologists
Primatologists
21st-century American women scientists
21st-century American zoologists
21st-century American women writers
20th-century American women writers
20th-century American women scientists
20th-century American zoologists